KAMN may refer to:

 Gratiot Community Airport (ICAO code KAMN)
 KAMN-LP, a defunct low-power television station (channel 61) formerly licensed to Wailuku, Hawaii, United States
 KAMN (FM), a radio station (98.1 FM) in Iliamna, Alaska